The 1994 Camden Council election took place on 5 May 1994 to elect members of Camden London Borough Council in London, England.  The whole council was up for election.  Labour stayed in overall control of the council, with both them and the Liberal Democrats making gains at the expense of the Conservatives in the north-west of the borough.

Election result

|}

Ward results

Adelaide

Belsize

Bloomsbury

Brunswick

Camden

Castlehaven

Caversham

Chalk Farm

Fitzjohns

Fortune Green

Frognal

Gospel Oak

Grafton

Hampstead Town

Highgate

Holborn

Kilburn

King's Cross

Priory

Regent's Park

St John's

St Pancras

Somers Town

South End

Swiss Cottage

West End

References

 

1994
1994 London Borough council elections